Jurak-e Nowzar (also Romanized as Jūrak-e Nowẕar; also known as Jorak-e Pāeen) is a village in Poshteh-ye Zilayi Rural District, Sarfaryab District, Charam County, Kohgiluyeh and Boyer-Ahmad Province, Iran. At the 2006 census, its population was 21, in 4 families.

References 

Populated places in Charam County